The Siemens-Halske Sh 11 was a seven-cylinder, air-cooled, radial engine for aircraft built in Germany in the 1920s. First run in 1925, it was rated at 75 kW (100 hp).

Applications
 Albatros L 68
 Bach 3-CT-2 Air Yacht
 Bach 3-CT-3 Air Yacht
 Bach 3-CT-4 Air Yacht
 BFW M.26
 LFG V 40
 Messerschmitt M 21
 Messerschmitt M 26
 Raab-Katzenstein Kl. 1 Schwalbe
 Udet U 12

References
 bungartz.nl

Aircraft air-cooled radial piston engines
Siemens-Halske aircraft engines
1920s aircraft piston engines